Flurry is an American mobile analytics, monetization, and advertising company founded in 2005. The company develops and markets a platform for analyzing consumer interactions with mobile applications, packages for marketers to advertise in-apps, as well as a service for applying monetization structures to mobile apps. Flurry analyzes 150 billion app sessions per month. The company's analytics platform tracks application sessions in iOS, Android, HTML5, and JavaME platforms. Flurry has raised a total of $65 million in funding since its founding and in March 2014 announced that it would partner with Research Now to create a panel database on mobile users. Flurry was acquired by Yahoo! on July 21, 2014 for somewhere between $200 and $300 million.

History
Flurry was launched in 2005 by entrepreneurs Sean Byrnes, Dan Scholnick, and Gabriel Vanrenen. It first started as a premium mobile applications company, that grew mostly in the developing world. As the team realized that it would be hard to monetize through advertising in these markets, they decided to pivot into a universal analytics platform that all mobile apps could use.

The Flurry analytics and advertising platform really started to take off with the advent of the iPhone, which, with its own App Store, democratized the ability for developers to launch mobile applications and instantly reach millions of people. The revolutionary part about the App Store was that developers could keep 70% of the revenue (with the App Store taking 30%), and make money in unprecedented ways due to the consumer distribution of the App Store. Google soon followed with their own version of the App Store (initially called Android Market), and soon after Flurry became the de facto analytics platform for mobile apps.

Flurry also merged with a company called Pinch Media based in New York that was working on a similar product, and together they had almost 80% marketshare for mobile analytics.

Services

Flurry Analytics 

Flurry Analytics enables users to analyze consumer behavior through data observations. The platform provides features for user segmentation, consumer funnels, and app portfolio analysis. The user segments can be categorized by things like paying versus non-paying customers or light versus heavy users. The platform's funnels measure customized consumer conversions and trending metrics, while the portfolio analytics feature allows companies to manage entire portfolios of mobile applications with the ability to monitor data about overlap among applications as well as up-sell and cross-sell conversions.

Flurry for Advertisers (formerly AppCircle) 

Flurry utilizes data-sets gathered from its base of 1.3 billion monthly active devices to help brands and app marketers segment and reach their desired audience in apps. Flurry for Advertisers uses information about app behavior and preferences to segment consumers into behavioral categories, called Personas, that advertisers can then reach with relevant messages about other apps or brand advertisements.

Flurry for Publishers (formerly AppSpot) 

Flurry for Publishers is a data-driven tool for generating advertising revenue through mobile applications. The monetization platform provides features such as ad serving, network mediation, targeting, and, among others, reporting. Flurry for Publishers also includes an auction-based real-time bidding marketplace which uses Flurry data to facilitate the buying and selling of advertising inventory based on an impression-by-impression basis.

References 

Advertising agencies of the United States
Mobile technology companies
Business services companies established in 2005
Yahoo! acquisitions
Yahoo!
American companies established in 2005